In infrared astronomy, the H band refers to an atmospheric transmission window centred on 1.65 micrometres with a Full width at half maximum of 0.35 micrometres
(in the near-infrared).

References 

Electromagnetic spectrum
Infrared imaging